Kyriakos Savvidis (born 20 June 1995) is a Greek professional footballer who plays as a midfielder for Slovak club Spartak Trnava.

Career
Kyriakos Savvidis at the end of the 2013–14 season, he tied his future with PAOK by making his debut with the first team and celebrating the championship with U-20 as one of the most important players. The 19 years' old midfielder signed a new four-year contract that will keep him with the club till the summer of 2018. The young midfielder knows that a signature on a paper can not secure a career and is ready to continue the hard work. "What I did before, I will continue to do now. It does not change anything for me. My own goal is one, the establishment in the first team"  he said.

On 23 February 2016, Savvidis joined Slovak club Zemplín Michalovce on a six-months loan deal, until the end of the 2015–16 season.

On 8 July 2016, he signed a two years' contract with Panionios for an undisclosed fee, while his previous club PAOK will keep a 30% resale clause.

On 24 January 2019, he signed a six-month contract with Aris Thessaloniki.
On 8 August 2019, he signed a year contract with Slovak club Zemplín Michalovce. On 9 September 2020, he signed a contract with another Fortuna Liga club Spartak Trnava.

Career statistics

Club

Honours
Spartak Trnava
Slovak Cup: 2021–22

References

External links
 
 OnSports

1995 births
Living people
Greek footballers
Greek expatriate footballers
Greece youth international footballers
Greece under-21 international footballers
Association football midfielders
PAOK FC players
OFI Crete F.C. players
Panionios F.C. players
Aris Thessaloniki F.C. players
MFK Zemplín Michalovce players
FC Spartak Trnava players
Super League Greece players
Slovak Super Liga players
Expatriate footballers in Slovakia
Greek expatriate sportspeople in Slovakia
Footballers from Thessaloniki